Janis Skroderis (born August 14, 1983) is a Latvian former professional tennis player, who played mainly on the ITF Futures tournaments.

In the 2004 Davis Cup, he played against the future world number one tennis player, 16-year-old Novak Djokovic, and lost 2–6, 2–6.

References
 http://www.daviscup.com/en/draws-results/tie/details.aspx?tieId=100004869

External links
 
 

Latvian male tennis players
People from Jūrmala
1983 births
Living people